Petchboonchu FA Group (เพชรบุญช เอฟ.เอ.กรุ๊ป) (born July 30, 1990) is a retired Thai Muay Thai fighter.

Petchboonchu started competing at the age of 7 and by the time he retired at 26, he had won a combined 13 Stadium and Thailand titles, making him one of the most decorated Muay Thai fighters ever. He is now a trainer at Evolve MMA in Singapore.

Titles and accomplishments
 Professional Boxing Association of Thailand (PAT) 
 2006 Thailand 105 lbs Champion
 2006 Thailand 108 lbs Champion
 2007 Thailand 112 lbs Champion
 2008 Thailand 122 lbs Champion
 2012 Thailand 135 lbs Champion
 2014 Thailand 135 lbs Champion
 2014 Thailand 140 lbs Champion
 Lumpinee Stadium 
 2007 Lumpinee Stadium 118 lbs Champion
 2008 Lumpinee Stadium 126 lbs Champion
 2009 Lumpinee Stadium 130 lbs Champion
 2011 Lumpinee Stadium 135 lbs Champion
 2013 Lumpinee Stadium 135 lbs Champion
 World Muaythai Council
 2013 WMC World 135 lbs Champion
 Siam Keela
 2013 Siam Keela "Fighter of the Year" Award
 Rajadamnern Stadium
 2014 Rajadamnern Stadium 140 lbs Champion
 Toyota Marathon 
 2014 Toyota Marathon Tournament Champion

Fight record

|-  style="background:#fbb;"
| 2015-12-08 || Loss ||align=left| Phetmorakot Petchyindee Academy || Lumpinee Stadium || Bangkok, Thailand || Decision || 5 || 3:00

|-  style="background:#cfc;"
| 2015-09-20 || Win ||align=left| Matt Embree || Top King World Series || Laos || Decision || 3 || 3:00

|-  style="background:#cfc;"
| 2015-07-01 || Win ||align=left| Daniel Puertas Gallardo || T-One || China || Decision || 5 || 3:00

|-  style="text-align:center; background:#cfc;"
| 2015-06-11 || Win ||align=left| Chamuaktong Fightermuaythai || Rajadamnern Stadium || Bangkok, Thailand || Decision || 5 || 3:00

|-  style="text-align:center; background:#fbb;"
| 2015-04-26|| Loss ||align=left| Kongsak Saenchaimuaythaigym || Rangsit Stadium || Bangkok, Thailand || Decision || 5 || 3:00

|-  style="text-align:center; background:#fbb;"
| 2015-02-07|| Loss ||align=left| Bobo Sacko || La Nuit des Titans, Final || France || Decision || 3 || 3:00

|-  style="text-align:center; background:#cfc;"
| 2015-02-07|| Win ||align=left| Mohamed Galaoui || La Nuit des Titans, Semi Finals || France || TKO || 2 ||

|-  style="text-align:center; background:#fbb;"
| 2014-11-29 || Loss ||align=left| Greg Wooton || Power Of Scotland 17 || United Kingdom || Decision || 5 || 3:00

|-  style="text-align:center; background:#fbb;"
| 2014-10-31 || Loss ||align=left| Nong-O Kaiyanghadaogym || Toyota marathon  || Thailand || Decision || 3 || 3:00

|-  style="text-align:center; background:#cfc;"
| 2014-10-31 || Win ||align=left| Singdam Kiatmuu9 || Toyota tournament || Thailand || Decision || 3 || 3:00

|-  bgcolor="#FFBBBB"
| 2014-10-09 || Loss ||align=left| Yodwicha Por Boonsit || Rajadamnern Stadium || Bangkok, Thailand || Decision || 5 || 3:00
|-
|-  bgcolor="#FFBBBB"
| 2014-09-10 || Loss ||align=left| Yodwicha Por Boonsit || Rajadamnern Stadium || Bangkok, Thailand || Decision || 5 || 3:00

|-  style="text-align:center; background:#cfc;"
| 2014-07-25 || Win ||align=left| Chamuaktong Fightermuaythai || Toyota Marathon, final  || Bangkok, Thailand || Decision || 3 || 3:00 
|-
! style=background:white colspan=9 | 

|-  style="text-align:center; background:#cfc;"
| 2014-07-25 || Win ||align=left| Jimmy Vienot || Toyota Marathon, Semi finals || Bangkok, Thailand || Decision || 3 || 3:00

|-  style="text-align:center; background:#cfc;"
| 2014-07-25 || Win ||align=left| Victor Nunez || Toyota Marathon, Quarter finals || Bangkok, Thailand || TKO || 2 ||

|-  style="text-align:center; background:#cfc;"
| 2014-07-08 || Win ||align=left| Saensatharn P.K. Saenchai Muaythaigym || Lumpinee Stadium || Bangkok, Thailand || TKO || 2 ||

|-  style="text-align:center; background:#cfc;"
| 2014-06-11 || Win ||align=left| Yodwicha Por Boonsit || Rajadamnern Stadium || Bangkok, Thailand || Decision || 5 || 3:00
|-
! style=background:white colspan=9 | 
|-
|-  bgcolor="#c5d2ea"
| 2014-05-08 || Draw ||align=left| Yodwicha Por Boonsit || Rajadamnern Stadium || Bangkok, Thailand || Draw|| 5 || 3:00
|-
|-  style="text-align:center; background:#cfc;"
| 2014-02-28 || Win ||align=left| Yodwicha Por Boonsit || Lumpini Stadium || Bangkok, Thailand || Decision || 5 || 3:00
|-
! style=background:white colspan=9 | 

|-  style="text-align:center; background:#cfc;"
| 2014-02-07 || Win ||align=left| Saenchai || Lumpinee Stadium || Bangkok, Thailand || Decision || 5 || 3:00
|-
! style=background:white colspan=9 | 

|-  style="text-align:center; background:#cfc;"
| 2014-01-07 || Win ||align=left| Pakorn PKSaenchaimuaythaigym || Lumpinee Stadium || Bangkok, Thailand || Decision || 5 || 3:00
|-
! style=background:white colspan=9 | 

|-  style="text-align:center; background:#cfc;"
| 2013-12-03 || Win ||align=left| Saenchai || Lumpinee Stadium || Bangkok, Thailand || Decision || 5 || 3:00

|-  style="text-align:center; background:#cfc;"
| 2013-10-31 || Win ||align=left| Vahid Shahbazi || Toyota Marathon || Thailand || Decision || 5 || 3:00

|-  style="text-align:center; background:#cfc;"
| 2013-10-11 || Win ||align=left| Singdam Kiatmuu9 || Lumpinee Stadium || Bangkok, Thailand || Decision || 5 || 3:00
|-
! style=background:white colspan=9 | 

|-  style="text-align:center; background:#fbb;"
| 2013-08-08 || Loss ||align=left| Chamuaktong Fightermuaythai || Rajadamnern Stadium || Bangkok, Thailand || Decision || 5 || 3:00

|-  style="text-align:center; background:#fbb;"
| 2013-07-12|| Loss ||align=left| Kongsak Saenchaimuaythaigym || Lumpinee Stadium || Bangkok, Thailand || Decision || 5 || 3:00

|-  style="text-align:center; background:#fbb;"
| 2013-05-10 || Loss ||align=left| Singdam Kiatmuu9 || Lumpinee Stadium || Bangkok, Thailand || Decision || 5 || 3:00

|-  bgcolor="#fbb"
| 2013-04-09 || Loss  ||align=left| Yodwicha Por Boonsit || Lumpinee Stadium || Bangkok, Thailand || Decision || 5 || 3:00
|-
! style=background:white colspan=9 | 

|-  style="text-align:center; background:#cfc;"
| 2013-02-07 || Win ||align=left| Thongchai Sitsongpeenong || Rajadamnern Stadium || Bangkok, Thailand || Decision || 5 || 3:00

|-  bgcolor="#fbb"
| 2013-01-04 || Loss ||align=left| Yodwicha Por Boonsit || Lumpinee Stadium || Bangkok, Thailand || Decision || 5 || 3:00

|-  style="text-align:center; background:#cfc;"
| 2012-12-07 || Win ||align=left| Diesellek Aoodonmuang || Lumpinee Stadium || Bangkok, Thailand || Decision || 5 || 3:00 
|-
! style=background:white colspan=9 | 

|-  style="text-align:center; background:#cfc;"
| 2012-10-04 || Win ||align=left| Nong-O Kaiyanghadaogym || Rajadamnern Stadium Wanmitchai Fight || Bangkok, Thailand || Decision || 5 || 3:00

|-  style="text-align:center; background:#cfc;"
| 2012-09-07 || Win ||align=left| Sagetdao Petpayathai || Lumpinee Stadium || Bangkok, Thailand || Decision || 5 || 3:00 
|-
! style=background:white colspan=9 | 

|-  style="text-align:center; background:#cfc;"
| 2012-07-31 || Loss ||align=left| Wanchalerm Uddonmuang || Lumpinee Stadium || Bangkok, Thailand || Decision || 5 || 3:00

|-  style="text-align:center; background:#fbb;"
| 2012-07-07 || Loss ||align=left| Sagetdao Petpayathai || || Surathani, Thailand || Decision || 5 || 3:00

|-  style="text-align:center; background:#fbb;"
| 2012-06-08 || Loss ||align=left| Nong-O Kaiyanghadaogym || Lumpinee Champion Krikkrai Fight || Bangkok, Thailand || Decision || 5 || 3:00

|-  style="text-align:center; background:#cfc;"
| 2012-04-03 || Win ||align=left| Wanchalerm Uddonmuang || Lumpinee Stadium || Bangkok, Thailand || Decision || 5 || 3:00

|-  style="text-align:center; background:#cfc;"
| 2012-03-12 || Win ||align=left| Jomthong Chuwattana || Rajadamnern Stadium || Bangkok, Thailand || Decision || 5 || 3:00

|-  style="text-align:center; background:#fbb;"
| 2011-10-07 || Loss ||align=left| Singdam Kiatmuu9 || Lumpinee Stadium || Bangkok, Thailand || Decision || 5 || 3:00

|-  style="text-align:center; background:#cfc;"
| 2011-09-13 || Win ||align=left| Saenchai || Lumpinee Stadium || Bangkok, Thailand || Decision || 5 || 3:00

|-  style="text-align:center; background:#cfc;"
| 2011-08-02 || Win ||align=left| Singdam Kiatmuu9 || Lumpinee Stadium || Bangkok, Thailand || Decision || 5 || 3:00

|-  style="text-align:center; background:#cfc;"
| 2011-07-07 || Win ||align=left| Sagetdao Petpayathai || Rajadamnern Stadium || Bangkok, Thailand || Decision || 5 || 3:00 
|-
! style=background:white colspan=9 |

|-  style="text-align:center; background:#cfc;"
| 2011-06-10 || Win ||align=left| Singdam Kiatmuu9 || Lumpinee Stadium || Bangkok, Thailand || Decision || 5 || 3:00
|-
! style=background:white colspan=9 |

|-  style="text-align:center; background:#fbb;"
| 2011-03-08 || Loss ||align=left| Sagetdao Petpayathai || Lumpinee Stadium || Bangkok, Thailand || Decision || 5 || 3:00
|-
! style=background:white colspan=9 |

|-  style="text-align:center; background:#fbb;"
| 2010-11-02 || Loss ||align=left| Nong-O Kaiyanghadaogym || Suek Lumpinee-Rajadamnern Special || Bangkok, Thailand || TKO || 3 ||

|-  style="text-align:center; background:#fbb;"
| 2010-10-05 || Loss ||align=left| Saenchai || Petyindee fights, Lumpinee Stadium || Bangkok, Thailand || Decision || 5 || 3:00
|-
! style=background:white colspan=9 |

|-  style="text-align:center; background:#cfc;"
| 2010-09-03 || Win ||align=left| Sagetdao Petpayathai || Lumpinee Stadium || Bangkok, Thailand || Decision || 5 || 3:00

|-  style="text-align:center; background:#cfc;"
| 2010-06-04 || Win||align=left| Sagetdao Petpayathai || Lumpinee Stadium || Bangkok, Thailand || Decision || 5 || 3:00 
|-
! style=background:white colspan=9 |

|-  style="text-align:center; background:#fbb;"
| 2010-05-07 || Loss ||align=left| Sagetdao Petpayathai || Lumpinee Stadium || Bangkok, Thailand || Decision || 5 || 3:00

|-  style="text-align:center; background:#fbb;"
| 2010-03-12 || Loss ||align=left| Nong-O Kaiyanghadaogym || Suek Petyindee, Lumpinee Stadium || Bangkok, Thailand || TKO || 2 ||

|-  style="text-align:center; background:#cfc;"
| 2010-02-10 || Win ||align=left| Orono Wor Petchpun || Daorungprabath Fight, Rajadamnern Stadium || Bangkok, Thailand || Decision || 5 || 3:00

|-  style="text-align:center; background:#fbb;"
| 2009-12-08 || Loss ||align=left| Nong-O Kaiyanghadaogym || Lumpinee Birthday Show || Bangkok, Thailand || TKO || 1 ||

|-  style="text-align:center; background:#cfc;"
| 2009-09-04 || Win ||align=left| Nong-O Kaiyanghadaogym || Suek Muay Thai champions of Lumpinee Champion Krikkrai || Bangkok, Thailand || Decision || 5 || 3:00

|-  style="text-align:center; background:#cfc;"
| 2009-08-07 || Win ||align=left| Saenchai || Petchpiya Fight, Lumpinee Stadium || Bangkok, Thailand || Decision || 5 || 3:00
|-
! style=background:white colspan=9 |

|-  style="text-align:center; background:#FFBBBB;"
| 2009-07-03 || Loss ||align=left| Saenchai || Lumpinee vs. Rajadamnern, Lumpinee Stadium, first opponent || Bangkok, Thailand || Decision (Unanimous) || 3 || 3:00

|-  style="text-align:center; background:#FFBBBB;"
| 2009-05-01 || Loss ||align=left| Nong-O Kaiyanghadaogym || Suek Petsupapan, Lumpinee Stadium || Bangkok, Thailand || Decision || 5 || 3:00

|-  style="text-align:center; background:#FFBBBB;"
| 2009-04-03 || Loss ||align=left| Saenchai || Lumpinee Stadium || Bangkok, Thailand || Decision (Unanimous) || 5 || 3:00

|-  style="text-align:center; background:#cfc;"
| 2009-03-06 || Win ||align=left| Jomthong Chuwattana || Suek Krikkrai Fights, Lumpinee Stadium || Bangkok, Thailand || Decision || 5 || 3:00
|-
! style=background:white colspan=9 | 

|-  style="text-align:center; background:#cfc;"
| 2009-02-06 || Win ||align=left| Wuttidet Lukprabat ||  || Bangkok, Thailand || Decision || 5 || 3:00

|-  style="text-align:center; background:#cfc;"
| 2008-12-09 || Win ||align=left| Saenghiran Loogbanyai || Lumpinee Stadium || Bangkok, Thailand || Decision || 5 || 3:00

|-  style="text-align:center; background:#cfc;"
| 2008-10-31 || Win ||align=left| Pansak Look Bor Kor || Lumpinee Stadium || Bangkok, Thailand || Decision || 5 || 3:00 
|-
! style=background:white colspan=9 | 

|-  style="text-align:center; background:#fbb;"
| 2008-09-30 || Loss||align=left| Wuttidet Lukprabat|| Lumpinee Stadium || Bangkok, Thailand || Decision || 5 || 3:00

|-  style="text-align:center; background:#cfc;"
| 2008-09-03 || Win ||align=left| Puengnoi Phetsupapan || Lumpinee Stadium || Bangkok, Thailand || Decision || 5 || 3:00

|-  style="text-align:center; background:#cfc;"
| 2008-08-08 || Win ||align=left| Karnchai Fairtex || Lumpinee Stadium || Bangkok, Thailand || Decision || 5 || 3:00

|-  style="text-align:center; background:#cfc;"
| 2008-07-29 || Win ||align=left| Tamwit Or Patcharee || Lumpinee Stadium || Bangkok, Thailand || Decision || 5 || 3:00

|-  style="text-align:center; background:#cfc;"
| 2008-07-04 || Win ||align=left| Rungruanlek Lookprabath  || Lumpinee Stadium || Bangkok, Thailand || Decision || 5 || 3:00

|-  style="text-align:center; background:#cfc;"
| 2008-06-04 || Win ||align=left| Detnarong Sitjaboon  || Rajadamnern Stadium || Bangkok, Thailand || Decision || 5 || 3:00

|-  style="text-align:center; background:#cfc;"
| 2008-05-02 || Win ||align=left| Kaptiankane Narupai  || Lumpinee Stadium || Bangkok, Thailand || Decision || 5 || 3:00
|-
! style=background:white colspan=9 | 

|-  style="text-align:center; background:#FFBBBB;"
| 2008-02-29 || Loss ||align=left| Sam-A Gaiyanghadao || Lumpinee Stadium || Bangkok, Thailand || TKO (Low kicks) || 4 ||

|-  style="text-align:center; background:#cfc;"
| 2008-01-29 || Win ||align=left| Meakpayak ||  || Thailand || Decision || 5 || 3:00

|-  style="text-align:center; background:#FFBBBB;"
| 2008-01-04 || Loss ||align=left| Sam-A Gaiyanghadao || Lumpinee Stadium || Bangkok, Thailand || Decision || 5 || 3:00

|-  style="text-align:center; background:#cfc;"
| 2007-12-07 || Win ||align=left| Rakkiat Kiatprapat || Lumpinee Stadium || Bangkok, Thailand || Decision || 5 || 3:00
|-
! style=background:white colspan=9 | 

|-  style="text-align:center; background:#cfc;"
| 2007-11-02 || Win ||align=left| Doungpichit || || Thailand || Decision || 5 || 3:00

|-  style="text-align:center; background:#cfc;"
| 2007-07-06 || Win ||align=left| Panomrunglek Kiatmoo9 || Lumpinee Stadium || Thailand || Decision || 5 || 3:00

|-  style="text-align:center; background:#cfc;"
| 2007-06-05 || Win ||align=left| Kompichit RiflorniaSauna || || Thailand || Decision || 5 || 3:00
|-
! style=background:white colspan=9 | 

|-  style="text-align:center; background:#cfc;"
| 2007-05-04 || Win ||align=left| Yodpetaek Sritmanarong || || Thailand || TKO || 2 ||

|-  style="text-align:center; background:#cfc;"
| 2007-01-30 || Win ||align=left| Suwitlek K.Sapaotong || || Thailand || DQ || 4 ||

|-  style="text-align:center; background:#cfc;"
| 2006-12-22 || Win ||align=left| Leamphet Sitjepatum || || Thailand || Decision || 5 || 3:00

|-  style="text-align:center; background:#cfc;"
| 2006-11-24 || Win ||align=left| Yodrachan Or Kietbanphot || || Thailand || Decision || 5 || 3:00 
|-
! style=background:white colspan=9 | 

|-  style="text-align:center; background:#FFBBBB;"
| 2006-07-14 || Loss ||align=left| Lekkla Tanasuranakorn || || Thailand || Decision || 5 || 3:00 
|-
! style=background:white colspan=9 | 

|-  style="text-align:center; background:#cfc;"
| 2006-04-25 || Win ||align=left| Lekkla Tanasuranakorn || || Thailand || Decision || 5 || 3:00 
|-
! style=background:white colspan=9 | 

|-  style="text-align:center; background:#cfc;"
| 2006-03-24 || Win ||align=left| Yodpoj S.Skaorath || || Thailand || Decision || 5 || 3:00

|-  style="text-align:center; background:#cfc;"
| 2005-11-15 || Win ||align=left| Buriangnong || || Thailand || Decision || 5 || 3:00

|-  style="text-align:center; background:#cfc;"
| 2005-09-10 || Win ||align=left| Lemphet S.Werapon || Lumpinee Stadium || Bangkok, Thailand || Decision || 5 || 3:00

|-  style="text-align:center; background:#FFBBBB;"
| 2005-08-10 || Loss||align=left| Lekkla Tanasuranakorn || || Thailand || Decision || 5 || 3:00

|-  style="text-align:center; background:#cfc;"
| 2005-07-29 || Win ||align=left| Petsiam S.Pantip || || Thailand || Decision || 5 || 3:00

|-  style="text-align:center; background:#cfc;"
| 2005-06-28 || Win ||align=left| Kaosod R.Kilaangtong || Lumpinee Stadium || Bangkok, Thailand || Decision || 5 || 3:00

|-  style="text-align:center; background:#FFBBBB;"
| 2005-03-04 || Loss||align=left| Lekkla Tanasuranakorn || || Thailand || Decision || 5 || 3:00

|-  style="text-align:center; background:#cfc;"
| 2005-02-01 || Win ||align=left| Luktob Mor Siprasert || || Thailand || Decision || 5 || 3:00

|-  style="text-align:center; background:#cfc;"
| 2004-09-04 || Win ||align=left| Mi Romsitong || || Thailand || Decision || 5 || 3:00

|-  style="text-align:center; background:#cfc;"
| 2004-08-10 || Win ||align=left| Petchnoi || || Thailand || Decision || 5 || 3:00 
|-
| colspan=9 | Legend:    

|-  bgcolor="#fbb"
| 2016-05-28 || Loss ||align=left| Magomed Zaynukov|| 2016 IFMA World Championships, Final || Jonkoping, Sweden || Decision (29:28) || 3 || 3:00
|-
! style=background:white colspan=9 |
|-  bgcolor="#cfc"
| 2016-05-26 || Win ||align=left| Aii Batmaz|| 2016 IFMA World Championships, Semi Finals || Jonkoping, Sweden || Decision (30:27) || 3 || 3:00

|-  bgcolor="#cfc"
| 2016-05-24 || Win ||align=left| Anton Petrov || 2016 IFMA World Championships, Quarter Finals || Jonkoping, Sweden || Decision (29:28) || 3 || 3:00

|-  bgcolor="#cfc"
| 2016-05-21 || Win ||align=left| Dmitry Varats|| 2016 IFMA World Championships, 1/8 Finals || Jonkoping, Sweden || Decision (29:28) || 3 || 3:00
|-
| colspan=9 | Legend:

References

1990 births
Living people
Petchboonchu FA Group